Kiasar is a city in Mazandaran Province, Iran.

Kiasar may also refer to:
 Kiasar, Alborz
 Kiasar, Gilan
 Kiasar, Behshahr, Mazandaran Province